György Bakos (born 6 July 1960 in Zalaegerszeg) is a retired hurdler from Hungary. He won two medals at the European Indoor Championships.

Biography

International competitions

External links

1960 births
Living people
People from Zalaegerszeg
Hungarian male hurdlers
Athletes (track and field) at the 1988 Summer Olympics
Olympic athletes of Hungary
World Athletics Championships athletes for Hungary
Universiade medalists in athletics (track and field)
Universiade silver medalists for Hungary
Medalists at the 1985 Summer Universiade
Competitors at the 1986 Goodwill Games
Friendship Games medalists in athletics
Sportspeople from Zala County